Paul Guest (born in Chattanooga, Tennessee) is an American poet and memoirist.

Biography
When he was twelve, Guest broke the third and fourth vertebrae in his neck in a bicycle accident, bruising his spinal cord and paralyzing him from the neck down.  He is a quadriplegic. He graduated from University of Tennessee at Chattanooga and from Southern Illinois University with an M.F.A. in 1999. He lives in Charlottesville, Virginia.

His poems appear in Harper's, The Paris Review, Tin House, The Kenyon Review, The Missouri Review, Slate and elsewhere.

Honors and awards
 2011 Guggenheim Fellowship in Poetry
 2010 Barnes & Noble Discover Great New Writers series
 2007 Whiting Award
 2006 Prairie Schooner Book Prize in Poetry
 2002 New Issues Press Poetry Prize

Published works
Full-Length Poetry Collections
 
 
 
 
 

a Memoir

References

External links
 "Author's blog"
 "Author's Twitter feed"
 "Character and Voice: Picks for National Poetry Month"
 "Paul Guest", Fishouse
 "An interview with poet Paul Guest", Poetry Foundation
Profile at The Whiting Foundation
 One More Theory About Happiness review, Creative Loafing Atlanta
Online Poems
 
 "The Intrusion of Ovid"; "LOVE IN THE SINGULAR"; "SMALL WONDER"; "THE ADVENT OF ZERO"; "PLUTO’S LOSS"; "CONSOLATION FOR VIRGIL"; "NOTES FOR MY BODY DOUBLE"; "Ode", The Adirondack Review
 "Apologia", Octopus, Issue 7
 "At Night, In November, Trying Not To Think Of Asphodel," "Austria," Bordering On The Tragic," "Oblivion: Letter Home, "Oblivion:  Letter Home"
 "DONALD DUCK'S LAMENT", Diagram 3.5
 "Landscape With Décolletage", Slate, May 7, 2002
 "Plenitude", Crazyhorse, Number 67
 "On the Persistence of the Letter as a Form"

Year of birth missing (living people)
Living people
American male poets
University of Tennessee at Chattanooga alumni
Southern Illinois University alumni
University of West Georgia faculty
American memoirists
American male non-fiction writers